The 2018 Mountain West Conference men's basketball tournament was the postseason men's basketball tournament for the Mountain West Conference. It was held from March 7–10, 2018 at the Thomas & Mack Center on the campus of University of Nevada, Las Vegas, in Las Vegas, Nevada. San Diego State defeated New Mexico in the championship game to win the tournament receive the conference's automatic bid to the NCAA tournament.

Seeds
All 11 MW schools were eligible to participate in the tournament. Teams were seeded by conference record, with a ties broken by record between the tied teams followed by record against the regular-season champion, if necessary. As a result, the top five teams receive a bye to the quarterfinals of the tournament. Tiebreaking procedures will remain unchanged from the 2017 tournament:

 Record between the tied teams
 Record against the highest-seeded team not involved in the tie, going down through the seedings as necessary
 Higher RPI:
 Head-to-head

Schedule

Bracket

* denotes overtime period

See also
2018 Mountain West Conference women's basketball tournament

References

Mountain West Conference men's basketball tournament
Mountain West Conference men's basketball tournament
Mountain West Conference men's basketball tournament
College sports tournaments in Nevada